(born 21 June 1974) is a Japanese short-track speed skater.  He received a bronze medal on the 500 m at the 1998 Winter Olympics in Nagano.

References

External links

1974 births
Living people
Japanese male short track speed skaters
Short track speed skaters at the 1998 Winter Olympics
Olympic short track speed skaters of Japan
Olympic medalists in short track speed skating
Olympic bronze medalists for Japan
Medalists at the 1998 Winter Olympics
Short track speed skaters at the 1999 Asian Winter Games
Asian Games medalists in short track speed skating
Asian Games silver medalists for Japan
Medalists at the 1999 Asian Winter Games